Dorothea Kreß (26 August 1924 – 25 October 2018) was a German athlete. She competed in the women's shot put at the 1952 Summer Olympics.

References

External links
 

1924 births
2018 deaths
Athletes (track and field) at the 1952 Summer Olympics
German female shot putters
Olympic athletes of Germany
People from Saaremaa Parish
20th-century German women
21st-century German women